Trinil is a palaeoanthropological site on the banks of the Bengawan Solo River in Ngawi Regency, East Java Province, Indonesia. It was at this site in 1891 that the Dutch anatomist Eugène Dubois discovered the first early hominin remains to be found outside of Europe: the famous "Java Man" (Homo erectus erectus) specimen.

References

Further reading

Archaeological sites in Indonesia
Prehistoric Indonesia
Homo erectus sites